Pope Martin I (between 590 and 600 – 16 September 655), also known as Martin the Confessor, was the bishop of Rome from 21 July 649 to his death 16 September 655. He served as Pope Theodore I's ambassador to Constantinople and was elected to succeed him as Pope. He was the only pope during the Eastern Roman domination of the papacy whose election was not approved by an imperial mandate from Constantinople. For his strong opposition to Monothelitism, Pope Martin I was arrested by Emperor Constans II, carried off to Constantinople, and ultimately banished to Cherson. He is considered a saint by both the Catholic Church and the Eastern Orthodox Church and he is the last pope recognized as a martyr.

Early life and career
Martin was born near Todi, Umbria, in the place now named after him (Pian di San Martino). According to his biographer Theodore, Martin was of noble birth, of commanding intelligence, and of great charity to the poor. Piazza states that he belonged to the order of St. Basil.

In 641, Pope John IV sent the abbot Martin into Dalmatia and Istria with large sums of money to alleviate the distress of the inhabitants, and redeem captives seized during the invasion of the Slavs. As the ruined churches could not be rebuilt, the relics of some of the more important Dalmatian saints were brought to Rome, where John then erected an oratory in their honour. Martin acted as apocrisiarius or legate at Constantinople in the early years of the pontificate of Theodore I (642–49), and was a deacon at the time of his election in 649.

Papacy (649–653)
When Martin I was elected pope, Constantinople was the capital of the Eastern Roman Empire and the patriarch of Constantinople was the most influential Church leader in the eastern Christian world. 
Martin had himself consecrated without waiting for the imperial ratification of the election. One of his first official acts was to summon the Lateran Council of 649 to deal with the Monothelites, whom the Church considered heretical. The Council met in the basilica of St. John Lateran. It was attended by 105 bishops (chiefly from Italy, Sicily, and Sardinia, with some from Africa and other quarters), held five sessions or secretarii from 5 October to 31 October 649, and in twenty canons condemned Monothelitism, its authors, and the writings by which Monothelitism had been promulgated. In this condemnation were included not only the Ecthesis (the exposition of faith of Patriarch Sergius I of Constantinople, for which Emperor Heraclius had stood sponsor), but also the Type issued by the reigning emperor, Constans II.

Martin was very energetic in publishing the decrees of the Lateran Council of 649 in an encyclical, and Constans replied by enjoining his exarch in Italy to arrest the pope should he persist and to send him as a prisoner to Constantinople. He was also accused by Constans of unauthorised contact and collaboration with the Muslims of the Rashidun Caliphate—allegations which he was unable to convince the infuriated imperial authorities to drop.

The arrest orders were impossible to carry out for some time. On 17 June 653, Martin was arrested in the Lateran along with Maximus the Confessor. He was hurried out of Rome and conveyed first to Naxos, Greece, and subsequently to Constantinople, where he arrived on 17 September 653. He was saved from execution by the pleas of Patriarch Paul II of Constantinople, who was himself gravely ill. Martin hoped that a new pope would not be elected while he lived but the imperial Byzantine government forced the Romans to find a successor. Eugene I was elected on 10 August 654, and Martin apparently acquiesced. After suffering an exhausting imprisonment and reportedly many public indignities, Martin was banished to Cherson, where he arrived on 15 May 655. He died there on 16 September.

Legacy

A selection of documents recording the trial and exile of Pope Martin I was translated into Latin in Rome in the ninth century by Anastasius Bibliothecarius.

Since the 1969 revision of the General Roman Calendar, the memorial of Saint Martin I, which earlier versions of the calendar place on 12 November, is on 13 April, celebrated as the formal anniversary of his death. In the Byzantine-rite Churches, his feast day is 14 April (27 April New Style).

Pope Pius VII made an honourable reference to Martin in his 1800 encyclical Diu satis:

The breviary of the Byzantine Churches states: "Glorious definer of the Orthodox Faith... sacred chief of divine dogmas, unstained by error... true reprover of heresy... foundation of bishops, pillar of the Orthodox faith, teacher of religion.... Thou didst adorn the divine see of Peter, and since from this divine Rock, thou didst immovably defend the Church, so now thou art glorified with him.”

References

Bibliography
 
 
 
 
 
 
 
West, Charles (2019), '“And how, if you are a Christian, can you hate the emperor?” Reading a Seventh-Century Scandal in Carolingian Francia', ed. Karina Kellermann, Alheydis Plassmann and Christian Schwermann (Bonn, 2019), https://hcommons.org/deposits/item/hc:27953

External links

 Pope Saint Martin I in Patron Saints Index
 Pope Martin I
 Colonnade Saints in St Peter's Square
 

598 births
655 deaths
7th-century archbishops
7th-century Christian saints
7th-century popes
Diplomats of the Holy See
Italian popes
Papal Apocrisiarii to Constantinople
Papal saints
People from Todi
Popes of the Byzantine Papacy
Popes
Year of birth unknown
Prisoners and detainees of the Byzantine Empire
Byzantine exiles
Italian exiles